Ayra Mariano (born January 10, 1998) is a Filipina-American actress, singer, dancer, host and commercial model. She first became known through a television commercial for Eskinol before participating in Starstruck Season 6, where she finished First Princess.

Early life
Mariano was born in Northern Mariana Islands and grew up in Bocaue, Bulacan, Philippines.

Career
She became known after being crowned as the First Princess of Starstruck 6. She then acted in supporting roles in shows such as Poor Señorita, Meant to be, Mulawin vs Ravena, G.R.I.N.D. Get Ready It's A New Day, Inday Will Always Love You and Sahaya.

In 2022, Ayra transferred to UNTV for her first morning program hosting stint Good Morning Kuya, with original host Kuya Daniel Razon with her co-host Joshua Dionisio, Ian Mercado and Tini Balanon.

Filmography

Notes

References

External links

Living people
Actresses from Bulacan
Filipino child actresses
Filipino female dancers
Filipino female models
Filipino television actresses
Filipino people of American descent
Northern Mariana Islands people of Filipino descent
GMA Network personalities
StarStruck (Philippine TV series) participants
Tagalog people
1998 births